Bateriki is a rural locality (a village) in Pereborskoye Rural Settlement, Beryozovsky District, Perm Krai, Russia. The population was 212 as of 2010. There are 7 streets.

Geography 
Bateriki is located on the Shakva River, 29 km north of  Beryozovka (the district's administrative centre) by road. Pozdino is the nearest rural locality.

References 

Rural localities in Beryozovsky District, Perm Krai